Thursday We Shall Sing Like Sunday is a 1967 Belgian-French comedy film directed by Luc de Heusch. It was entered into the 5th Moscow International Film Festival.

Cast
 Marie-France Boyer as Nicole
 Bernard Fresson as Jean
 Étienne Bierry as Devos
 Francis Lax as Marc
 Françoise Vatel as Francine
 Hervé Jolly as Pierre
 Raymond Avenière as Raoul
 Simonne Durieu as La mère de Jean

References

External links
 

1967 films
1967 comedy films
Belgian comedy films
French comedy films
1960s French-language films
Belgian black-and-white films
Films scored by Georges Delerue
French-language Belgian films
1960s French films